Qeshquneh, also rendered as Qeshqeneh, may refer to:
 Qeshquneh-ye Olya
 Qeshquneh-ye Sofla